48 Shades of Brown is a young-adult novel by Australian author Nick Earls, published by Penguin Books in 1999. The novel was awarded Children's Book of the Year: Older Readers by the Children's Book Council of Australia in 2000. The novel has been adapted into a play and a film.

Plot
In his final year at school, and with his parents overseas, Dan is forced to grow up fast when he moves in with his 22-year-old aunt Jacq and her eccentric friend Naomi. His story is light-hearted and funny, with a definite twist of insanity.

Adaptations

In 2001, Philip Dean adapted the novel into a play for the La Boite Theatre Company. The play's script was published by Currency Press. The novel was also adapted into a film, titled 48 Shades, which is now available on DVD after screening across cinemas in Australia in 2006.

References

External links
Children's Book Council of Australia The Children's Book Of The Year Awards: Winners and Shortlists 2000–2009.
Sunny Garden Official Nick Earls website blurb, praise and jacket designs.

1999 Australian novels
Australian young adult novels
Australian novels adapted into films
Novels set in Queensland
Novels by Nick Earls